Broad Street is one of the 25 ancient wards of the City of London.

History
In medieval times it was divided into ten precincts and contained six churches, of which only two, St Margaret Lothbury  and All Hallows-on-the-Wall now survive: St Bartholomew-by-the-Exchange was demolished in 1840, St Benet Fink in 1844, St Martin Outwich in 1874 and St Peter le Poer in 1907.

The ward's northern boundary along London Wall and Blomfield Street borders Coleman Street ward, before curving to the north-east along Liverpool Street, the division with Bishopsgate. From here, Old Broad Street runs south-west along the border with Cornhill where it joins Throgmorton Street, its southern boundary—to the south of which is the Bank of England in Walbrook ward. The western boundary follows a series of small courts and alleys adjacent to Moorgate and then runs up Copthall Avenue. A busy commercial area it also contains two livery halls of the Worshipful Company of Carpenters and Worshipful Company of Drapers. Like many of the City wards it has a social club for people who work in the area, which celebrated its 30th anniversary in March 2006.

At the top of Old Broad Street, adjacent to Liverpool Street station, was Broad Street station which closed in 1986—the only major terminus station in London to have permanently closed.

Politics
Broad Street is one of 25 wards in the City of London, each electing an alderman to the Court of Aldermen and  commoners (the City equivalent of a councillor) to the Court of Common Council of the City of London Corporation. Only electors who are Freemen of the City of London are eligible to stand.

Elected representatives
 Alderman: Michael Mainelli
 Deputy: Christopher Hayward
 Common Council: Shahnan Bakth, Antony Manchester

References

External links
Broad Street Ward The Official Ward Website
City of London Corporation Map of City of London Wards (2003 —)
Broad Street Ward Club - a Social Club based in the City of London
Map of Early Modern London:  Broad Street Ward - Historical Map and Encyclopedia of Shakespeare's London (Scholarly)

Wards of the City of London